Nolina is a genus of  tropical xerophytic flowering plants, with the principal distribution being in Mexico and extending into the southern United States. They are large, dioecious plants.

Some botanists have included the genus Beaucarnea in Nolina. In the APG III classification system, it is placed in the family Asparagaceae, subfamily Nolinoideae (formerly the family Ruscaceae). Former alternative placements include Nolinaceae and Agavaceae. The genus is named for 18th century French arboriculturist Abbé C. P. Nolin. Members of the genus are known as beargrasses, some of which are cultivated as ornamental plants.

Species

Accepted species:

 Nolina arenicola Correll – Trans-Pecos beargrass - western Texas
 Nolina atopocarpa Bartlett – Florida beargrass - Florida 
 Nolina azureogladiata D.Donati - Oaxaca
 Nolina beldingi Brandegee - Baja California Sur
 Nolina bigelovii (Torr.) S.Watson – Bigelow's nolina - Sonora, Arizona, southern Nevada, southern California
 Nolina brittoniana Nash – Britton's beargrass - Florida
 Nolina cespitifera Trel. - Coahuila, Zacatecas, Nuevo León
 Nolina cismontana Dice – Peninsular beargrass - southern California
 Nolina durangensis Trel. - Chihuahua, Durango
 Nolina erumpens (Torr.) S.Watson – Foothill beargrass - Chihuahua, western Texas
Nolina excelsa García-Mend. & E.Solano - Oaxaca
 Nolina georgiana Michx. – Georgia beargrass - Georgia, South Carolina
 Nolina greenei S.Watson ex Trel. – Woodland beargrass - New Mexico, southern Colorado, northwestern Texas, panhandle of Oklahoma
 Nolina hibernica Hochstaetter & D.Donati - Tamaulipas, Nuevo León
 Nolina humilis S.Watson - Guanajuato, San Luis Potosí
 Nolina interrata Gentry – Dehesa beargrass - San Diego County, northern Baja California
 Nolina juncea (Zucc.) J.F.Macbr. - northern Mexico
 Nolina lindheimeriana (Scheele) S.Watson – Devil's shoestring, Lindheimer nolina - central Texas
 Nolina matapensis Wiggins - Sonora, Chihuahua
 Nolina micrantha I.M.Johnst. – Chaparral beargrass - Coahuila, Chihuahua, western Texas, southern New Mexico
 Nolina microcarpa S.Watson – Palmilla Sacahuista - Chihuahua, Sonora, Arizona, New Mexico, southwestern Utah
 Nolina nelsonii Rose - Tamaulipas
 Nolina palmeri S.Watson - Baja California
 Nolina parryi S.Watson – Parry's beargrass - Arizona, southern California, Baja California, Sonora
 Nolina parviflora (Kunth) Hemsl. - central and southern Mexico
 Nolina pumila Rose - northern and central Mexico
 Nolina rigida Trel.  - Mexico; apparently extinct
 Nolina texana S.Watson – Texas sacahuista - Texas, New Mexico, Oklahoma, Chihuahua, Coahuila

Formerly placed here
Beaucarnea gracilis Lem. (as N. gracilis (Lem.) Cif. & Giacom.)
Beaucarnea guatemalensis Rose (as N. guatemalensis (Rose) Cif. & Giacom.)
Beaucarnea recurvata Lem. (as N. recurvata (Lem.) Hemsl.)

References

External links

  Nolina in Flora of North America
  photos on www.AIAPS.org

 
Asparagaceae genera
Dioecious plants